Naneun Ggomsuda, also known as Naggomsu or in English as I'm a weasel is a popular South Korean political podcast under the internet newspaper, Ddanzi Ilbo. Naneun Ggomsuda is famous for lampooning the South Korean president, Lee Myung-bak. The hosts of Naneun Ggomsuda humorously call Lee Myung-bak as His Excellency or Gaka (각하) in Korean as a sarcastic title. They have also made a satire song (based on a Christian hymn, Nearer, My God, to Thee) about Lee's disputes on his Naegok-dong property purchase. Kim Ou joon (김어준) was the original creator of Naneun Ggomsuda and currently runs Papa is (파파이스) and News factory (뉴스공장)

Political Culture
The third son of former president Kim Dae-jung, Kim Hong-geol, comically cited a joke from Naneun Ggomsuda in which the criminal charge against the former anchor of Naneun Ggomsuda, Chung Bong-ju, was explained as "in order to prepare for Lee Myung-bak's prison life" during the publication and charity event for Lee Seo-ryeong (이서령), the head of the Daejeon branch of the Democratic United Party, on January 7, 2012.

Censorship
The South Korean military under the Lee Myung-bak government cracks down soldiers who have "critical apps" installed in their smartphones; allegedly marking Naneun Ggomsuda as an anti-government content.

Media Impact 
Naneun Ggomsuda has been downloaded by six million people since it was started in April, 2011 to November, 2011.

See also
 Criticism of Lee Myung-bak

References

External links
 Talking with ‘Petty Creep’ Kim Ou-joon 
 Satire in South Korea: Sneaky tricksters, unite!, The Economist, Jan 16th 2012 

2011 in South Korea
Lee Myung-bak
Audio podcasts
2012 in South Korea
2011 podcast debuts
Political podcasts